Vanimo (Wanimo, Manimo) is a Skou language of Papua New Guinea which extends from  Leitre to Wutung on the Papua New Guinea - Indonesian border.

Phonology
The Duso dialect of Vanimo is unusual in not having any phonemic velar consonants, though it does have phonetic .

The vowels of Dumo dialect are,

All occur nasalized, varying phonetically between a nasal vowel and a vowel followed by consonantal . Nasal /u/ may be realized as a syllabic .

In Dumo, there are no velar consonants apart from this  (and also as noted below). The other consonants are, 

Consonant clusters are /pl, bl, ml, ɲv, hv, hm, hn, hɲ, hj/ (hv and hm may be allophones). /ɲv/ is pronounced .

 do occur in Dusö dialect.

Dumo syllables may have either a 'high' or a 'long' tone. There is strict syllable timing, a 'long'-toned syllable takes the entire time allotted for a syllable, whereas with a high-tone or atonic syllable, there is a slight gap between it and the following syllable. Ross writes high tone with a grave accent, and long tone with an acute accent. A syllable with a nasal vowel / coda  is not necessarily long, it may have any of the three tones.

References

Further reading
 

Languages of Sandaun Province
Western Skou languages